Charles Martin Borchers (November 18, 1869 – December 2, 1946) was a U.S. Representative from Illinois.

Born in Lockville, Ohio, Borchers moved to Illinois with his parents, who settled in Macon County in 1875. He attended the common schools. He taught school in Macon County for seven years. He studied law. He was admitted to the bar in 1897 and commenced practice in Decatur, Illinois. He served as mayor of Decatur 1909–1911.

Borchers was elected as a Democrat to the Sixty-third Congress (March 4, 1913 – March 3, 1915). He was an unsuccessful candidate for reelection in 1914 to the Sixty-fourth Congress. He resumed the practice of law. He again served as mayor of Decatur 1919–1923. He was an unsuccessful Democratic candidate for Governor in 1924. He died in Decatur, Illinois, December 2, 1946. He was interred in West Frantz Cemetery, Oakley, Illinois.

References

1869 births
1946 deaths
People from Fairfield County, Ohio
Mayors of Decatur, Illinois
Democratic Party members of the United States House of Representatives from Illinois
Illinois lawyers
Schoolteachers from Illinois